The Hardy Monument is a  monument on the summit of Black Down in Dorset, erected in 1844 by public subscription in memory of Vice Admiral Sir Thomas Hardy, flag captain of Admiral Lord Nelson at the Battle of Trafalgar. 

Admiral Hardy lived in Portesham and his family owned the Portesham estate which stretched from the middle of Portesham to Black Down. The site for the monument was chosen because the Hardy family wanted a monument which could be used as a landmark for shipping.

The monument is situated on Black Down, a hill overlooking the English Channel near Portesham in Dorset, England, on the road between Abbotsbury and Martinstown. It was restored in 1900 by his descendants and bought in 1938 by the National Trust for the sum of £15.

The monument was designed to look like a spyglass, as Admiral Hardy would have used on board ship. Its eight corners are aligned with the compass points. Viewed from the ground the corner to the right of the lightning conductor points due south.

The monument was closed to the public in 2009 when major renovation work was required. This work was completed in January 2012. To date, the monument is regularly opened during the peak season, where visitors can climb the 120 steps to the viewpoint at the top.

The heathland area around the monument was in 1984 designated a Site of Special Scientific Interest, when the Nature Conservancy Council decided that the geology of the area was very rare.

The monument was designated as a Grade II listed building in 1956.

Adjacent to the monument is a stone seat erected in memory of Lt Col William Digby Oswald who was killed on the Somme in 1916.

Geology
Geologically, Black Down is the western tip of the Bagshot gravel beds. The gravel beds extend to the east as far as London.

The ground around the monument is pitted with various holes and craters. Many of these are dolines or swallow holes. These are formed when rain falls on the highly acidic topsoil. The water increases in acidity as it percolates through the topsoil then dissolves the underlying chalk. Eventually there is nothing but topsoil above the caverns so formed and the familiar shape of a doline is created when the topsoil collapses into the cavern beneath. Dolines are usually shaped like a teardrop cut in half vertically and laid down horizontally. Within  of the monument there are three dolines which were formed by the chalk being dissolved in a vertical fissure in its structure. These dolines are vertically sided and are shaped like wells. The one which opened in 2006 is not quite vertical and its depth is unknown.

Geodesy
The Hardy Monument was the origin (meridian) of the 6 inch and 1:2500 Ordnance Survey maps for Somerset and Dorset.

References

External links

  Hardy Monument information at the National Trust

Monuments and memorials in Dorset
National Trust properties in Dorset
Buildings and structures completed in 1844